Emily Tremaine is an American actress, best known for playing Audrey Bidwell, Donald Ressler's (Diego Klattenhoff) former fiancée on NBC's The Blacklist and Natalie Atwood on Freeform's Guilt.

Career
In 2016, Tremaine was recurring on HBOs Vinyl as Heather, receptionist of American Century. Later, she played Natalie Atwood, a main role on Freeform's series Guilt. In 2018, Tremaine guested on Bull in the episode "Bad Medicine" as Laura Anthony.

Filmography

Film

Television

References

External links
 

1989 births
American film actresses
American television actresses
Living people
21st-century American actresses
People from Rochester, Minnesota
Sarah Lawrence College alumni